Earl Francis Blumenauer (born August 16, 1948) is an American lawyer, author, and politician serving as the U.S. representative for  since 1996. The district includes most of Portland east of the Willamette River.

A member of the Democratic Party, Blumenauer previously spent over 20 years as a public official in Portland, including serving on the Portland City Council from 1987 to 1996, when he succeeded Ron Wyden in the U.S. House of Representatives. Wyden was elected to the U.S. Senate after Bob Packwood resigned.

Early life and education
Blumenauer was born in Portland on August 16, 1948. In 1966, he graduated from Centennial High School on Portland's east side and then enrolled at Lewis & Clark College. He majored in political science and received a Bachelor of Arts degree from Lewis & Clark in 1970. Blumenauer completed his education in 1976 when he earned a Juris Doctor degree from the school's Northwestern School of Law (now Lewis & Clark Law School). Before starting law school in 1970 and until 1977, he worked as an assistant to the president of Portland State University.

Early political career
In 1969–70, Blumenauer organized and led Oregon's "Go 19" campaign, an effort to lower the state voting age (while then unsuccessful, it supported the national trend that soon resulted in the Twenty-sixth Amendment to the United States Constitution, which lowered the voting age to 18). In 1972, he was elected to the Oregon House of Representatives, representing the 11th district in Multnomah County. He was reelected in 1974 and 1976, and continued representing Portland and Multnomah County until the 1979 legislative session. From 1975 to 1981 he served on the board of Portland Community College. After his time in the Oregon legislature, he served on the Multnomah County Commission from 1979 to 1986. He lost a race for Portland City Council to Margaret Strachan in 1981. He left the county commission in March 1986 to run again for city council.

Blumenauer was elected to the Portland City Council in May 1986. His first term began in January 1987, and he remained on the council until 1996. From the start of his first term, he was named the city's Commissioner of Public Works, which made him the council member in charge of the Portland Bureau of Transportation (also known as the Transportation Commissioner). During his time on the council, Blumenauer was appointed by Oregon Governor Neil Goldschmidt to the state's commission on higher education, on which he served in 1990 and 1991. In 1992, Blumenauer was defeated by Vera Katz in an open race for mayor of Portland—to date, only the second time that Blumenauer has lost an election. At the time he was called "the man who probably knows the most about how Portland works", but he left local politics to run for Congress. After winning election to Congress, he resigned from the city council in May 1996. In 2010, Blumenauer received The Ralph Lowell Award for outstanding contributions to public television.

U.S. House of Representatives

Tenure
Blumenauer was elected to the United States House of Representatives in 1996 in a special election to fill the vacancy caused by the election of then-U.S. Representative Ron Wyden to the U.S. Senate. He received 69% of the vote, defeating Republican Mark Brunelle. He was elected to a full term that November, and has been reelected 10 more times without serious difficulty in what has long been Oregon's most Democratic district, never with less than 66% of the vote.

Blumenauer served as Oregon campaign chair for both John Kerry's and Barack Obama's presidential campaigns.

In Congress, Blumenauer is noted for his advocacy for mass transit, such as Portland's MAX Light Rail and the Portland Streetcar, and, as a strong supporter of legislation that promotes bicycle commuting, cycles from his Washington residence to the Capitol and even to the White House for meetings.

Among the bills Blumenauer has sponsored that have become law are the Bunning-Bereuter-Blumenauer Flood Insurance Reform Act of 2004 and the Senator Paul Simon Water for the Poor Act of 2005. In addition, the Legal Timber Protection Act passed as part of the 2008 Farm Bill, while the Bicycle Commuter Act passed with the 2008 bailout bill.

Blumenauer was active in pressuring the United States to take greater action during the Darfur conflict.

In the political aftermath of Hurricane Katrina, Blumenauer noted that he was among those who had pointed out the vulnerability of New Orleans and encouraged Congress to help that city and the gulf coast get better prepared:
 September 15, 2004: Mr. Speaker, barely have we recovered from Hurricane Hugo and we are seeing Hurricane Ivan pose the threat that has long been feared by those in Louisiana, that this actually might represent the loss of the City of New Orleans. Located 15 feet below sea level, there is the potential of a 30-foot wall of water putting at risk $100 billion of infrastructure and industry and countless lives.
 January 26, 2005: Mr. Speaker, I recently had the opportunity to view the devastation in Southeast Asia as a result of the tsunami. As appalled as I was by what I saw, I must confess that occasionally my thoughts drifted back to the United States. What would have happened if last September, Hurricane Ivan had veered 40 miles to the west, devastating the city of New Orleans? One likely scenario would have had a tsunami-like 30-foot wall of water hitting the city, causing thousands of deaths and $100 billion in damage...The experience of Southeast Asia should convince us all of the urgent need for congressional action to prevent wide-scale loss of life and economic destruction at home and abroad. Prevention and planning will pay off. Maybe the devastation will encourage us to act before disaster strikes.

Blumenauer supports the World Trade Organization (WTO) and has voted for "free trade" agreements with Peru, Australia, Singapore, Chile, Africa, and the Caribbean. His support for these agreements has angered progressives, environmental and labor activists. In 2004, he voted against the Central America Free Trade Agreement (CAFTA). On September 24, 2007, four labor and human rights activists were arrested in Blumenauer's office protesting his support for the Peru Free Trade Agreement.

In February 2009, after a domesticated chimpanzee in Connecticut severely mauled a woman, gaining national attention, Blumenauer sponsored the Captive Primate Safety Act to bar the sale or purchase of non-human primates for personal possession between states and from outside the country. In June 2008, Blumenauer had sponsored legislation to ban interstate trafficking of great apes, which had passed in the House but been tabled by the Senate.

Blumenauer received some media attention during the political debate over health care reform for sponsoring an amendment to the America's Affordable Health Choices Act of 2009 to change procedures to mandate that Medicare pay for end-of-life counseling. The amendment, as introduced, was based on an earlier proposal cosponsored by Blumenauer and Republican Representative Charles Boustany of Louisiana. The amendment generated controversy, with conservative figures, such as 2008 vice presidential nominee and former Alaska governor Sarah Palin, suggesting that the amendment, if made law, would be used as a cover for the federal government to set up "death panels" that would be used to determine which people received medical treatment. Blumenauer called the claim "mind-numbing" and an "all-time low." His rebuke was echoed by Republican Senator Johnny Isakson of Georgia, who called the "death panels" claim "nuts."

On July 24, 2014, Blumenauer introduced the Emergency Afghan Allies Extension Act of 2014 (H.R. 5195; 113th Congress), a bill that would authorize an additional 1,000 emergency Special Immigrant Visas that the United States Department of State could issue to Afghan translators who served with U.S. troops during the War in Afghanistan. He argued that "a failure to provide these additional visas ensures the many brave translators the U.S. promised to protect in exchange for their services would be left in Afghanistan, hiding, their lives still threatened daily by the Taliban."

Blumenauer skipped all of President Trump's State of the Union addresses, saying, "I refuse to be a witness to his continued antics." In 2019 he was one of the first lawmakers to come out in support of the Green New Deal.

In July 2019, Blumenauer voted against a House resolution introduced by Representative Brad Schneider opposing efforts to boycott the State of Israel and the Global Boycott, Divestment, and Sanctions Movement targeting Israel for its continued occupation of Palestine. The resolution passed 398-17.

In November 2020, Blumenauer was named a candidate for Secretary of Transportation in the incoming Biden Administration. Pete Buttigieg was eventually chosen instead.

Committee assignments
 Committee on Ways and Means
 Subcommittee on Health

Caucus memberships

Congressional Progressive Caucus
 Congressional Cannabis Caucus
 Renewable Energy and Energy Efficiency Caucus
 Sustainable Energy and Environment Coalition
 National Guard and Reserve Component Caucus
 Animal Protection Caucus
 Historic Preservation Caucus
 International Conservation Caucus
 Coalition on Adoption
 Fitness Caucus
 Bosnia Caucus
 Korea Caucus
 Diabetes Caucus
 Congressional Bike Caucus
 Caucus to Control and Fight Methamphetamine
 Human Rights Commission
 House Oceans Caucus
 Internet Caucus
 Congressional Asian and Pacific American Caucus
 Dem Caucus Congressional Taskforce on Seniors
 Wild Salmon Caucus
 High Performance Building
 Congressional Human Trafficking Caucus
 Congressional Land Conservation Caucus
 Urban Caucus
 Wine Caucus
 Small Brewers Caucus
 Quality Care Caucus
 Congressional Arts Caucus
United States Congressional International Conservation Caucus
Climate Solutions Caucus
U.S.-Japan Caucus
Medicare for All Caucus

Political positions
In 1996, Blumenauer's first year in Congress, he voted in support of the Defense of Marriage Act, which passed that year. The law was found unconstitutional in 2013 and repealed. Since then he has supported LGBTQ rights.

On October 1, 2015, following the Umpqua Community College shooting, Blumenauer tweeted his report addressing the issue of gun violence in America, Enough is Enough: A Comprehensive Plan to Improve Gun Safety, which he had published earlier that year.

Blumenauer has supported alternative energy sources, health care reform, and continuing federal support for education. He is also known as one of the most fervent advocates for the legalization of marijuana, co-founding the Congressional Cannabis Caucus. He was the chief sponsor of a bill to expand the research of medical cannabis and its drug derivatives that passed the House in July 2022 and the Senate in November.

Personal life
Blumenauer has been married to Margaret Kirkpatrick since 2004.

An avid cyclist, Blumenauer is the founder and co-chair of the Congressional Bike Caucus.

Each year, in the weeks leading up to Christmas, Blumenauer bakes and delivers hundreds of fruitcakes to his colleagues on the Hill.

Electoral history

Write-in and minor candidate notes: In 1996, write-ins received 531 votes. In 2000, write-ins received 576 votes. In 2002, write-ins received 1094 votes. In 2014, write-ins received 1,089 votes. In 2018, write-ins received 514 votes.

See also
 Blumenauer Bridge

References

External links

 Congressman Earl Blumenauer official U.S. House website
 Campaign website
 
 

 Oregon Secretary of State:
 May special election,
 November general election
 Willamette Week:
 November 1997: The Player
 November 2002: Fall Voter's Guide 2002, with a Blumenauer endorsement
 February 2004: The Earl of Trolleys

|-

1948 births
20th-century American politicians
21st-century American politicians
Cycling advocates
Democratic Party members of the United States House of Representatives from Oregon
Lawyers from Portland, Oregon
Lewis & Clark Law School alumni
Living people
Democratic Party members of the Oregon House of Representatives
Multnomah County Commissioners
Portland City Council members (Oregon)